Postplatyptilia paraglyptis is a moth of the family Pterophoridae. It is known from Argentina.

The wingspan is about 14 mm.

References

paraglyptis
Moths described in 1908